Mid Bus was a corporation which specialized in manufacturing customized school buses. Formed in 1981 by former employees of Superior Coach Company in Lima, Ohio, it grew from a dozen employees working in a small facility in Lima to become one of the country's largest manufacturers of smaller school buses, moving to a much larger facility a few miles north of Lima in 1995.   

The company was acquired by Collins Bus Corporation in 1998. On September 19, 2007, Collins announced plans to close the Mid Bus plant in Ohio and consolidate all manufacturing at the Collins facility in Kansas.

History

In 1980, in the US, there were six major school bus body companies building large school buses, mostly making bodies for chassis from four truck manufacturers, joined by two coach-type school bus builders on the West Coast. Most also made some smaller buses of various types. With the baby boom years which swelled the ranks of school children in the past, the manufacturing industry faced serious over-capacity as companies vied and competed for lower volumes of purchases. 

In 1981, when Sheller-Globe Corporation, a diversified industrial conglomerate closed down its large Superior Coach Company bus factory in Lima, Ohio, three former managers created Mid Bus, manufacturing Superior's smallest Type A bus under the new "Superior by Mid Bus" brand name. 

Initially, they had a seven other former employees of the large factory, and worked in a small shop. As other small bus products were added, Superior by Mid Bus was shortened to Mid Bus. In the late 1980s, the company acquired the Minuteman product line from AmTran (formerly Ward Body Company) and in the early 1990s, the tooling and product rights to Busette from Wayne Corporation. 

After a succession of larger facilities in Lima, around 1995, the company moved to a much larger facility in Bluffton, Ohio. Mid Bus became a subsidiary of Collins Industries, a publicly traded stock company, in 1998. On September 19, 2007, Collins announced plans to close the Mid Bus plant in Ohio and consolidate all manufacturing at the Collins facility in Kansas.

Products
 Guide SRW - Ford E350 or GMC 3500/Chevy 3500 chassis
 Guide DRW - Ford E350 or GMC 3500/Chevy 3500 chassis
 Guide XL - GMC 4500/5500 chassis
 MFSAB - Ford E350 or GMC 3500/Chevy 3500 chassis
 Guide AL - international 3400 chassis

External links

 Mid Bus homepage

References

Defunct bus manufacturers of the United States
School bus manufacturers
Defunct companies based in Ohio
Manufacturing companies based in Ohio
Lima, Ohio
Vehicle manufacturing companies established in 1981
Manufacturing companies disestablished in 2008
1981 establishments in Ohio
2008 disestablishments in Ohio